Pilanco (possibly from the Ancash Quechua word for dam,)  is a mountain in the north of the Cordillera Blanca in the Andes of Peru, about  high. It is located in Yuracmarca District, Huaylas Province, Ancash. Pilanco lies northeast of Santa Cruz, northwest of Alpamayo and east of Millwaqucha. Los Cedros Creek flows along its southern slopes, receiving the name Alpamayo in that section.

References

Mountains of Peru
Mountains of Ancash Region
Glaciers of Peru